Lisbeth Bodd (28 January 1958 – 28 September 2014) was a Norwegian performance artist and theatre leader.

She established the performance art group Verdensteatret in 1986, and was artistic director for the company until her death. Verdensteatret received the Hedda Honorary Award in 2014.

References

1958 births
2014 deaths
Artists from Oslo
Norwegian women artists